Juan Bautista Soler Luján is a Spanish businessman and former president of Valencia Club de Fútbol. He is a real estate developer and investor, based in Valencia.

His eponymous Grupo Juan Bautista Soler creates large apartment buildings and residential developments in Southern Spain.  Along with other real estate developers like Manuel Manrique, José Manuel Loureda, Manuel Jove, and Rafael del Pino, Soler has ridden the wave of increasing economic growth in Spain since its addition to the European Union. In particular he has worked with fellow developers Enrique Buñuelos and Joaquín Rivero. His real estate developments and partnerships have resulted in immense wealth. In 2004, he became president of Valencia. 
On 12 March 2008, he resigned as chairman of Valencia CF.

In 2014 he was arrested for attempting to hire an Eastern European hitman to abduct the president who had succeeded him at Valencia CF, Vicente Soriano, in a dispute over shares. . He has been barred from leaving the country, and from entering within 15 metres of Soriano.

References

External links
Official website

1956 births
Living people
Valencia CF
Spanish billionaires
21st-century Spanish criminals
20th-century Spanish businesspeople
21st-century Spanish businesspeople